Bellemo is an Italian surname. Notable people with the surname include:

 Alessandro Bellemo (born 1995), Italian footballer
 Bonaventura Bellemo (died 1602), Roman Catholic bishop

Italian-language surnames